Charles Chouteau Gratiot (August 29, 1786 – May 18, 1855) was born in St. Louis, Spanish Upper Louisiana Territory, now the present-day State of Missouri.  He was the son of Charles Gratiot, Sr., a fur trader in the Illinois country during the American Revolution, and Victoire Chouteau, who was from an important mercantile family. His father became a wealthy merchant, during the early years of St. Louis.
After 1796, Charles was raised in the large stone house purchased by his father in St. Louis, near the Mississippi River.  He made a career out of being a U.S. Army military engineer, becoming the Chief Engineer of the United States Corps of Engineers, and supervised construction of a number of important projects.  He was dismissed by William Henry Harrison, which led to a protracted controversy.

Military career
President Thomas Jefferson personally appointed him (and 3 other young Missouri men) as a United States Military Academy cadet in July 1804. The U.S. Military Academy at West Point, New York, was the first school of engineering in the United States and graduated its first class in 1802. Gratiot was a member of the Class of 1806, the fourth graduating class, and was commissioned in the Corps of Engineers.  He became a captain in 1808 and assisted Alexander Macomb in constructing fortifications in Charleston, South Carolina.  He returned to his alma mater in 1810 to be commander of the Army garrison at West Point during 1810–1811.

As General William Henry Harrison's Chief Engineer in the War of 1812, he distinguished himself by planning and building Fort Meigs in 1813. He also rebuilt Fort St. Joseph, later renamed Fort Gratiot in his honor. In 1814 he took part in the attack of the Battle of Mackinac Island.  He received the Thanks of Congress for his efforts during the war.

He served as Chief Engineer, 1817–1818, in Michigan Territory followed by assignment as the superintending engineer, 1819–1828, for the construction of defenses at Hampton Roads, Virginia.

Chief of Engineers
On May 24, 1828, Gratiot was appointed colonel of engineers, brevet brigadier general, and Chief Engineer.   For ten years he administered an expanding program of river, harbor, road, and fortification construction.   He also engaged in a lengthy dispute with War Department officials over benefits, and in 1838 President Martin Van Buren dismissed him for failing to repay government funds that had been entrusted to him.

He assigned Robert E. Lee to do engineering in the Mississippi River at St. Louis, Missouri.

Late life
Gratiot became a clerk in the General Land Office from 1840–1855 and died in St. Louis.

Gratiot became a party to lengthy litigation against the United States government, which was appealed twice to the U.S. Supreme Court.  It is said that the General of the Army, Alexander Macomb, was of the opinion that President Martin Van Buren's actions were too harsh.

Family
He married Ann Belin on April 22, 1819. They had two children:
 Marie Victoire Gratiot (1820–1878). Married Charles-François-Frédéric, marquis de Montholon-Sémonville. Had issue.
 Julia Augusta Gratiot (1824–1895). Married Charles Pierre Chouteau. Had issue.

Death and legacy, tributes and memorials
 His remains are interred in section 13 of Calvary Cemetery in St. Louis, Missouri.
 Fort Gratiot, Michigan, was named after Gratiot, who oversaw its reconstruction in 1814 to guard the mouth of the St. Clair River at Lake Huron.  Fort Gratiot Park is located there.

 Gratiot Avenue, an early roadway between Detroit and Port Huron, Michigan, was named for the fort near Port Huron, which was in turn named for Gratiot. Construction started in Detroit in 1829, and the roadway was completed in the same year to Mount Clemens. The rest was finished in 1833. Sections of the roadway are designated as state highways M-3 or M-19, and before I-94 was built, Gratiot Avenue was the main link between the two cities.
 Gratiot is the namesake of the village of Gratiot, Ohio.
  Point Gratiot, Point Gratiot Light (a/k/a Dunkirk Lighthhouse) and Point Gratiot Park in Dunkirk, New York are also named for him.
Gratiot County, Michigan is named for Gratiot. It was described by the Territorial Legislature in 1831. By 1837, the Territory had been admitted to the Union as a state; in 1855 the State Legislature authorized the organization of Gratiot County—the death year of the county's namesake.

See also
 List of Michigan county name etymologies

References

Notes

Citations

 This article contains public domain text from Portraits and Profiles of Chief Engineers: Colonel Charles Gratiot.
 Information about his parents at the Lewis and Clark Expedition page from National Park Service.

External links

 U.S. Army Corps of Engineers, Commanders of the Corps of Engineers, Charles Gratiot.
  at Find a Grave

United States Military Academy alumni
People from Missouri in the War of 1812
American people of Swiss descent
1786 births
1845 deaths
Military personnel from St. Louis
Burials at Calvary Cemetery (St. Louis)